Birkinshaw may refer to:

People with the surname
Alan Birkinshaw (born 1944), British film director and producer
James Birkinshaw (born 1980), English speedway rider
John Birkinshaw, English railway engineer
Julian Birkinshaw, English academic
Mark Birkinshaw, British physicist
Steve Birkinshaw, British fell runner
William Birkinshaw Wilkinson (1854–1927), British businessman